Jordi Torres (born 19 July 1964) is an Andorran alpine skier. He competed in three events at the 1984 Winter Olympics.

References

External links
 
 
 

1964 births
Living people
Andorran male alpine skiers
Olympic alpine skiers of Andorra
Alpine skiers at the 1984 Winter Olympics
People from Encamp